Carla Jayne Hrdlicka (born c. 1963) is an American-born business executive based in Australia. She is currently the chairman and Board President of Tennis Australia, having been appointed in October 2017. In November 2020, she became the chief executive officer (CEO) of Australian airline Virgin Australia, replacing Paul Scurrah.<ref>Paul Scurrah resigns as Virgin Australia chief executive News.com.au 15 October 2020</ref>

Early life and education
Hrdlicka was born in Wichita, Kansas, in the United States. Her father Richard Hrdlicka is from Czechoslovakia and worked as a lawyer, eventually becoming the general counsel of automotive manufacturer Fiat in North America; he was also director of a community bank in Newton, Kansas. Her father had defected from Czechoslovakia while he was in Paris competing as a member of a national hockey team in 1948 at the age of sixteen. After his defection he wrote letters to American teenagers that he had met the previous year as a Scout while attending the World Scout Jamboree in France; the American teenagers raised the funds necessary for him to migrate to the US. Her mother Carol Hrdlicka (née'' Knott) was from a Kansas ranching family. She has a younger brother named David.

Hrdlicka attended Newton High School in Newton, Kansas; during her high school years she became the Kansas state champion in the sport of tennis. She went on to college in Colorado after high school, graduating from Colorado College in Colorado Springs with a bachelor of arts degree in mathematics and economics. She also holds an MBA from Tuck School of Business at Dartmouth College in New Hampshire.

Career
Between 1987 and 1991 then again from 1997 until 2010, Hrdlicka held senior positions at Bain & Company, initially in the United States, then in Australia, after she emigrated to that country from the US in 1994 to take charge of a company producing sports trading cards in Sydney. She also held a senior position at Arthur Young & Company. From 2010 to 2012 Hrdlicka was a senior executive at Australian airline Qantas. In July 2012 Hrdlicka was appointed group chief executive officer at Qantas subsidiary Jetstar, a position she held until November 2017, when she was appointed the CEO of Qantas Loyalty and Digital Ventures, the company within Qantas responsible for the airline's frequent-flyer program. She left Qantas in April 2018 and in July 2018 she became managing director, chief executive officer and director of The a2 Milk Company, a dairy company based in Auckland, New Zealand. She stepped down from a2 Milk in December 2019; she later said she left a2 because her husband was found to have a kidney tumour.

Hrdlicka was a director of Tennis Australia between January 2016 and October 2017 and was appointed Board President and Chair of Tennis Australia in October 2017. She also served as a director at Woolworths from 2010 to 2016. She is a member of Tuck School of Business' Asian Advisory Board. On 18 November 2020, Hrdlicka became the CEO of Virgin Australia Holdings (parent company of Virgin Australia, Qantas and Jetstar's main competitor) when Bain Capital took ownership of the airline, following the resignation of Paul Scurrah.

Personal life
Hrdlicka is married to Jason Gaudin, an Australian who formerly worked as Head of Corporate & Investment Banking Australia & New Zealand at Wells Fargo Bank. They have two sons: Alec (born 2004)  and Josh (born 2007). Both sons have attended the Rafa Nadal Tennis Academy in Majorca. The family's permanent residence is in Brisbane, where Virgin Australia is headquartered. Hrdlicka's previous home in the Melbourne suburbs was listed for sale in June, 2022, with a sale price estimate of $18 million to $19 million.

References

American emigrants to Australia
American people of Czech descent
Bain & Company employees
Colorado College alumni
Living people
People from Kansas
Tuck School of Business alumni
Year of birth missing (living people)